Jaagup Loosalu (also Jakob Loosalu, born Jakob Veide; 1 January 1898 Aleksandri Parish (now Kose Parish), Kreis Harrien – 5 May 1996 Pärnu) was an Estonian publisher, journalist, agricultural scientist and politician. He was a member of III Riigikogu.

References

1898 births
1996 deaths
People from Kose Parish
People from Kreis Harrien
Settlers' Party politicians
Members of the Riigikogu, 1926–1929
Members of the Riigikogu, 1929–1932
Members of the Riigikogu, 1932–1934
Estonian publishers (people)
Estonian journalists
Estonian scientists
Estonian agrarianists
University of Tartu alumni